Events from the year 1600 in France

Incumbents
 Monarch – Henry IV

Events

Births

12 December – Denis of the Nativity, sailor and cartographer (died 1638)

Full date missing
Jacques Blanchard, painter
Marie de Rohan, aristocrat (died 1679)
Marin le Roy de Gomberville, poet and novelist (died 1674)

Deaths
4 May – Jean Nicot, diplomat and scholar (born 1530)

Full date missing
Gilles de Noailles, ambassador (born 1524)

See also

References

1600s in France